Parliamentary elections were held in Croatia on 25 November 2007 and for overseas voters on 24 and 25 November. The campaign officially started on 3 November. The President of Croatia announced elections on 17 October and 14 days were allowed for candidate lists to be submitted.

Elections were held in 10 electoral districts inside Croatia (each providing 14 members of parliament), one electoral district for Croatian citizens living abroad (with a maximum 12 members of parliament), and one electoral district for national minorities (8 members of parliament). Candidate lists have to win more than 5% of the votes in at least one electoral district in order to be represented in the parliament. 4,478,386 people in total were eligible to vote, 405,092 of whom are in the diaspora, 280,000 living in Bosnia-Herzegovina.

To prevent possible electoral fraud, such as votes from the deceased, or people voting twice in different locations, the Croatians outside Croatia who were eligible to vote had to register no later than 14 days before the election.

In three locales, the election were repeated on 9 December 2007; while this could not and did not change the final result as far as mandates are concerned, it meant the final result became known only on 11 December 2007.

The governing centre-right Croatian Democratic Union emerged as the relative winner of the election, but failed to obtain an outright majority. The opposition centre-left Social Democratic Party of Croatia achieved their best result ever as a party, but were unsuccessful in their attempt to become the strongest single party. The election resulted in the formation of the Sanader II cabinet supported by HDZ, HSS, HSLS and the representatives of national minorities.

Participating parties
Croatian political parties and independent lists had to formally submit their candidates and eventual pre-election coalitions not later than 30 October. 3585 people from political parties or independent lists applied for the elections (22 people per seat). There were 235 political party lists, 16 independent lists and 72 candidates for minority seats. 29.93% of the candidates were women. The average age of the candidates was 43.41 years old; 44.70 for men, and 40.40 for women. The oldest candidate was 89, and the youngest 18. The State Electoral Committee had to confirm the lists before midnight of 2 November.

Parliamentary parties and coalitions 

 Croatian Democratic Union (HDZ)
 Social Democratic Party (SDP)
 Croatian Peasant Party–Croatian Social Liberal Party-Alliance of Primorje-Gorski Kotar-Democratic Party of Zagorje-Zagorje Party) (HSS-HSLS-PGS-ZDS-ZS)
 Croatian People's Party – Liberal Democrats (HNS)
 Istrian Democratic Assembly (IDS)
 Croatian Party of Right (HSP)
 Croatian Democratic Alliance of Slavonia and Baranja (HDSSB)
 Croatian Party of Pensioners (coalition with Democratic Party of Pensioners) (HSU)
 Democratic Centre-Green Party – Green Alternative (DC-Zeleni)
 Independent Democratic Serb Party (national minorities electorate and 9th electorate) (SDSS)
 Political parties and lists of national minorities (12th electorate)

Parliamentary parties are with bolded acronyms.

Non-parliamentary parties 
 Croatian Youth Party (HSM)
 Croatian Democratic Peasants' Party (HDSS)
 Croatian Pure Party of Right (HČSP)
 Croatian Christian Democratic Union (HKDU)
 Croatian Christian Democrats (Demokršćani)
 United Supporters of the Croatian Party of Right Movement (HP-HPP)
 Green List of Croatia (Zelena lista)
 Only Croatia – Movement for Croatia (Jedino Hrvatska)

Non-parliamentary coalitions 
 "Left Coalition": Left of Croatia-Socialist Labour Party of Croatia-Istrian Social Democratic Forum-Croatian Socialdemocrats (Ljevica-SRP-ISDF-HSD)
 "United Left": Social Democratic Action of Croatia-Croatian Labour Party-Green Party-Adriatic Social Democratic Party of Croatia. In some electorates also with Women's Democratic Party. (ASH-HRS-ZS-JSD-DSŽ)
 Croatian Christian Democratic Party–Christian Social Union (HKSS-KSU)
 Democratic Union of Međimurje–Slavonia-Baranja Croatian Party–Dalmatian Liberal Party (in some electorates with Alliance of Primorje-Gorski Kotar) (DSM-SBHS-DLS-PGS)
 Greens of Croatia-Women's Democratic Party (Zeleni HR-DSŽ)
 Party of Pensioners-Istrian Social Democratic Independent Party (SU-ISDNS)

Independent Lists 
 Slaven Letica
 Boris Mikšić
 Hrvoje Hitrec
 Ivan Lončar
 Drago Krpina
 Tonči Tadić
 Jerko Ivanković Lijanović

Distribution of minority seats 
 Serbs: 3
 Hungarians: 1
 Italians: 1
 Czechs and Slovaks: 1
 Austrians, Bulgarians, Germans, Poles, Romani, Romanians, Rusyns, Russians, Turks, Ukrainians, Vlachs and Jews: 1
 Albanians, Bosniaks, Montenegrins, Macedonians, Slovenes: 1

Announced boycotts 
Marginal right wing Croatian Party of Right 1861 decided not to participate in the 2007 elections as they claimed the elections were unconstitutional.

Election spending 

On 11 December 2007 GONG and Transparency International Croatia had published media spending of all Croatian political parties during the election period. This numbers are :

Croatian Democratic Union 25,476,833 HRK or 51.9% of total
Social Democratic Party of Croatia 8,150,728 HRK or 16.6% of total
Croatian Peasant Party-Croatian Social Liberal Party 4,923,277 HRK or 10.0% of total
Croatian People's Party 4,204,998 HRK or 8.6% of total
Croatian Party of Right 3,082,071 HRK or 6.1% of total
Istrian Democratic Assembly 611,406 HRK or 1.2% of total
Croatian Party of Pensioners 520,362 HRK or 1.1% of total
Only Croatia – Movement for Croatia 348,686 HRK or 0.7% of total
Democratic Centre 329,151 HRK or 0.7 of total
Croatian Democratic Alliance of Slavonia and Baranja 283,212 HRK or 0.6% of total

Electoral districts

Since 1999 Croatia has been divided into 10 geographically-based electorates with around 250 000 - 300 000 registered voters. Each electorate elects up to 14 MPs chosen by the standard D'Hondt formula.

In the 11th electorate, up to 12 members are chosen by proportional representation - depending on a number of voters in Croatia - to represent Croatian citizens residing abroad (known as the diaspora electorate) and 8 members from ethnic/national minorities.

It has to be noted that in Croatia, the official threshold is 5% for parties and coalitions. However, since the country is divided in 10 voting districts with 14 elected representatives each, sometimes the threshold can be higher, depending on the number of "fallen lists" (lists that don't get at least 5%). If many votes are lost in this manner, a list that gets barely more than 5% will still get a seat, whereas if there is a small number of parties that all pass the threshold, the actual ("natural") threshold is close to 7.15%.

This system is greatly favorable to regional parties, i.e. parties that gain their votes in a single electorate (see IDS, HDSSB), and it is disfavorable to parties that have greater numbers but are widespread throughout the nation (see HSU and HSP).

This made also the forming of post-electoral coalitions somewhat unpredictable, as the overall success of one of the greatest parties can effectively turn out to be counterproductive if it is achieved at the expense of their foreseeable partner, causing them to not pass the threshold in some or all electorates (it happened to the HDZ-led coalition in previous 2003 election).

Opinion polls

Results

Most opinion polls in the days before the election predicted a very tight race between the governing Croatian Democratic Union and the opposition Social Democratic Party of Croatia. On the night of the election, after all the polls around the country closed, all major television networks released the results of the exit polls. All of them showed the social democrats with a slight lead. None of the exit polls, however, took into account the votes coming from the citizens living abroad, which tend to vote for the more conservative option. The first official results published at 9 p.m. showed HDZ with a slight lead. Ivo Sanader gave a victory speech close to midnight saying he will be forming the next government. Despite the election loss, SDP individually as a party achieved its best result ever, even better than the 2000 election result when SDP led a victorious coalition. Most smaller parties lost seats, the Croatian People's Party – Liberal Democrats lost 4 seats from the 2003 election, the Croatian Peasant Party also lost 4 seats and the far-right Croatian Party of Rights suffered its worst election results since the 1990s losing 7 seats and winning only 1.

National minorities elected 8 representatives through a separate election system: Milorad Pupovac (25,3% of votes), Vojislav Stanimirović (21,5%) and Ratko Gajica (15,8%) for the Serb national minority, Deneš Šoja (47,8%) for the Hungarian minority, Furio Radin (88,8%) for the Italian minority, Zdenka Čuhnil (26%) for the Czech and Slovak minorities, Nazif Memedi (12,8%) for the Austrian, Bulgarian, German, Jewish, Polish, Roma, Romanian, Rusyn, Russian, Turkish, Ukrainian, Vlach minorities and Šemso Tanković (30,9%) for the Albanian, Bosniak, Macedonian, Montenegrin and Slovene minorities.

Turnout

By electoral district

Government formation

On night of the elections, after first seat projections were announced, the president of the Croatian Democratic Union announced that he spoke with the President of the Republic and that he will be forming the government. A few minutes after him, the president of the Social Democratic Party informed the public that he too spoke with president and that he too was commencing the formation of the government.

President Mesić explained that his constitutional obligation was to give a mandate to form a government to a person who presents him with convincing proof that they have support of a majority of the newly elected parliament. As the president failed to announce that he will give the mandate to Ivo Sanader, leader of the party with the most seats in the parliament, he was criticised by many for complicating the situation and starting a political crisis. President Mesić responded that he was following article 97 of the Constitution of Croatia.

HDZ, together with HSU and Roma national minority member Nazif Memedi had 68 of 77 seats required for a majority while SDP, HNS, IDS and SDA together had 67 seats.  Therefore, the HSS-HSLS coalition which had 8 seats was instrumental in forming a government. Before the elections, leaders of the coalition stated that they will first speak with the party which wins the most seats (not counting diaspora seats). As this turned out to be HDZ, negotiations between HDZ and HSS-HSLS of a coalition started on 3 December.

Although HSS-HSLS started negotiating with HDZ, the president of SDP Milanović refused to give up and still claimed that SDP was also in a process of forming of a government because SDP, HNS, IDS and SDA won 150 thousand votes more than HDZ (not counting diaspora). HDSSB had declared support for SDP if SDP-formed government will work "in the interest of Slavonia and Baranja", but Milanović stated that he firmly believed that SDP will form the government even without support from HDSSB. Although up until 25 November Ljubo Jurčić still claimed that he was SDP's candidate for premier, on 30 November Milanović announced that he was assuming responsibility for forming SDP-led government. Jurčić confirmed that he thinks that "responsibility for functioning of the government should be distributed among heads of parties and that is the best concept in this circumstances". Heads of HSS-HSLS coalition Adlešič and Friščić declared this decision to be "very important and could influence their decision about who they will support". Adlešić added that Milanović is "much better premier candidate than Jurčić and that SDP would probably have better election results if Milanović made this decision earlier".

On 12 December it was announced that coalition talks between HDZ and the HSS-HSLS were close to completion and the odds of HSS-HSLS entering into discussions with SDP were announced by Božidar Pankretić as very low. Three days later, President Mesić held a second round of consultations with parliamentary parties and was reassured that HDZ and HSS-HSLS are finishing their negotiations. Mesić considered that a proof that Sanader had support of the majority of Sabor and handed him a mandate to form a government. Following that announcement, Milanović again reiterated that SDP still hasn't given up on forming a government. Sanader described this behaviour as "not fitting the democratic standards" and that president would have much easier job if SDP just acknowledged their defeat.

The first session of the newly elected parliament was called for 11 January 2008, and on 12 January, the parliament approved Sanader's cabinet.

Notes

References

External links

2007 electoral posters
2007 Parliamentary election in Croatia site (Official)
2007 Croatian Parliamentary election; Croatian radiotelevision site (Unofficial)
2007 Croatian Parliamentary election; Croatian People's Party - Liberal Democrats site (Unofficial)
2007 Parliamentary election in Croatia site (Unofficial)
Croatian Parliament (Official) 

Elections in Croatia
Croatia
Parliamentary election
Croatia
2007 elections in Croatia